, also known by Prince , was a royal of the Ryukyu Kingdom. He was father of King Shō Hō.

Shō Kyū was the third son of King Shō Gen, and was the originator of a royal family, Kin Udun. He had three famous sons: the eldest son King Shō Hō; the fourth son Kin Chōtei; and the seventh son Gushikawa Chōei.

Shō Kyū was posthumously honored as king in 1699, and his spirit tablet was placed in Sōgen-ji. His title was stripped in 1719, and his spirit tablet was moved to Tennō-ji.

References

|-

Second Shō dynasty
Princes of Ryūkyū
People of the Ryukyu Kingdom
1560 deaths
1620 deaths